Semipalatinsk Oblast (Semei oblysy) was an administrative division of the Kazakh Soviet Socialist Republic in the Soviet Union, established on October 14, 1939 from parts of East Kazakhstan and Alma-Ata Oblasts. Upon Kazakhstan's independence in 1991, the oblast continued to exist until 1997, when it was merged back into East Kazakhstan Oblast.

References

Notes

Sources

1930s establishments in the Kazakh Soviet Socialist Republic